Cormac Karl "Max" Christie Jr. (born February 10, 2003) is an American professional basketball player for the Los Angeles Lakers of the National Basketball Association (NBA). He played college basketball for the Michigan State Spartans of the Big Ten Conference. He was a consensus five-star recruit and one of the top shooting guards in the 2021 class.

High school career
Christie played basketball for Rolling Meadows High School in Rolling Meadows, Illinois and was teammates with his younger brother, Cameron. In his freshman season, he averaged 20 points, nine rebounds and four assists per game. As a sophomore, Christie averaged 25.5 points, ten rebounds and 3.2 assists per game. He scored a career-high 51 points against Elk Grove High School. In his junior season, Christie averaged 25 points and 11 rebounds per game, earning Pioneer Press Player of the Year honors. As a senior, he averaged 24.0 points, 10.1 rebounds, 3.9 assists and 3.1 steals per game, leading his team to a 15–0 record. Christie was selected as Chicago Sun-Times Player of the Year, News-Gazette All-State Player of the Year and Illinois Gatorade Player of the Year. He was named to the rosters for the McDonald's All-American Game, Jordan Brand Classic and Nike Hoop Summit.

Recruiting
Christie was a consensus five-star recruit and one of the top shooting guards in the 2021 class. On July 7, 2020, he committed to playing college basketball for Michigan State over offers from Duke, Villanova and Ohio State, among others.

College career
On January 5, 2022, Christie scored a season-high 21 points in a 79–67 win against Nebraska. As a freshman, he averaged 9.3 points and 3.5 rebounds per game and was named to the Big Ten All-Freshman Team. On April 1, 2022, Christie declared for the 2022 NBA draft while maintaining his college eligibility and on May 16 announced he would hire an agent and remain in the draft.

Professional career

Los Angeles Lakers (2022–present) 
Christie was selected by the Los Angeles Lakers in the second round of the 2022 NBA draft with the 35th overall pick. Christie joined the Lakers' 2022 NBA Summer League roster. In his Summer League debut, Christie scored five points and nine rebounds in a 100–66 California Classic win against the Miami Heat. On July 8, 2022, Christie signed his rookie scale contract with the Lakers. He was assigned to the South Bay Lakers of the NBA G League on March 8, 2023. He was recalled by the Los Angeles Lakers from South Bay two days later.

National team career
Christie represented the United States at the 2019 FIBA Under-16 Americas Championship in Brazil. He averaged 9.5 points and 3.3 rebounds per game, helping his team win the gold medal.

Career statistics

College

|-
| style="text-align:left;"| 2021–22
| style="text-align:left;"| Michigan State
| 35 || 35 || 30.8 || .382 || .317 || .824 || 3.5 || 1.5 || .5 || .5 || 9.3

Personal life
Christie's mother, Katrinas, played college basketball at Northwestern, scoring over 1,000 points, and is a psychologist. His father, Max Sr., played college basketball at Parkland College and Wisconsin–Superior before becoming an aircraft pilot.

References

External links
Michigan State Spartans bio
USA Basketball bio

2003 births
Living people
American men's basketball players
Basketball players from Illinois
Los Angeles Lakers draft picks
Los Angeles Lakers players
McDonald's High School All-Americans
Michigan State Spartans men's basketball players
People from Arlington Heights, Illinois
Shooting guards
South Bay Lakers players